In fluid dynamics, wind wave modeling describes the effort to depict the sea state and predict the evolution of the energy of wind waves using numerical techniques. These simulations consider atmospheric wind forcing, nonlinear wave interactions, and frictional dissipation, and they output statistics describing wave heights, periods, and propagation directions for regional seas or global oceans.  Such wave hindcasts and wave forecasts are extremely important for commercial interests on the high seas. For example, the shipping industry requires guidance for operational planning and tactical seakeeping purposes.

For the specific case of predicting wind wave statistics on the ocean, the term ocean surface wave model is used.

Other applications, in particular coastal engineering, have led to the developments of wind wave models specifically designed for coastal applications.

Historical overview

Early forecasts of the sea state were created manually based upon empirical relationships between the present state of the sea, the expected wind conditions, the fetch/duration, and the direction of the wave propagation. Alternatively, the swell part of the state has been forecasted as early as 1920 using remote observations.

During the 1950s and 1960s, much of the theoretical groundwork necessary for numerical descriptions of wave evolution was laid. For forecasting purposes, it was realized that the  random nature of the sea state was best described by a spectral decomposition in which the energy of the waves was attributed to as many wave trains as necessary, each with a specific direction and period. This approach allowed to make combined forecasts of wind seas and swells.  The first numerical model based on the spectral decomposition of the sea state was operated in 1956 by the French Weather Service, and focused on the North Atlantic.  The 1970s saw the first operational, hemispheric wave model: the spectral wave ocean model (SWOM) at the Fleet Numerical Oceanography Center.

First generation wave models did not consider nonlinear wave interactions.  Second generation models, available by the early 1980s, parameterized these interactions.  They included the “coupled hybrid” and “coupled discrete” formulations.  Third generation models explicitly represent all the physics relevant for the development of the sea state in two dimensions.  The wave modeling project (WAM), an international effort, led to the refinement of modern wave modeling techniques during the decade 1984-1994.
Improvements included two-way coupling between wind and waves, assimilation of satellite wave data, and medium-range operational forecasting.

Wind wave models are used in the context of a forecasting or hindcasting system. Differences in model results arise (with decreasing order of importance) from: differences in wind and sea ice forcing, differences in parameterizations of physical processes, the use of data assimilation and associated methods, and the numerical techniques used to solve the wave energy evolution equation.

General strategy

Input

A wave model requires as initial conditions information describing the state of the sea.  An analysis of the sea or ocean can be created through data assimilation, where observations such as buoy or satellite altimeter measurements are combined with a background guess from a previous forecast or climatology to create the best estimate of the ongoing conditions. In practice, many forecasting system rely only on the previous forecast, without any assimilation of observations.

A more critical input is the "forcing" by wind fields: a time-varying map of wind speed and directions. The most common sources of errors in wave model results are the errors in the wind field.  Ocean currents can also be important, in particular in western boundary currents such as the Gulf Stream, Kuroshio or Agulhas current, or in coastal areas where tidal currents are strong. Waves are also affected by sea ice and icebergs, and all operational global wave models take at least the sea ice into account.

Representation

The sea state is described as a spectrum; the sea surface can be decomposed into waves of varying frequencies using the principle of superposition. The waves are also separated by their direction of propagation. The model domain size can range from regional to the global ocean.  Smaller domains can be nested within a global domain to provide higher resolution in a region of interest.  The sea state evolves according to physical equations – based on a spectral representation of the conservation of wave action – which include: wave propagation / advection, refraction (by bathymetry and currents), shoaling, and a source function which allows for wave energy to be augmented or diminished.  The source function has at least three terms: wind forcing, nonlinear transfer, and dissipation by whitecapping. Wind data are typically provided from a separate atmospheric model from an operational weather forecasting center.

For intermediate water depths the effect of bottom friction should also be added. At ocean scales, the dissipation of swells - without breaking - is a very important term.

Output

The output of a wind wave model is a description of the wave spectra, with amplitudes associated with each frequency and propagation direction. Results are typically summarized by the significant wave height, which is the average height of the one-third largest waves, and the period and propagation direction of the dominant wave.

Coupled models

Wind waves also act to modify atmospheric properties through frictional drag of near-surface winds and heat fluxes.  Two-way coupled models allow the wave activity to feed back upon the atmosphere. The European Centre for Medium-Range Weather Forecasts (ECMWF) coupled atmosphere-wave forecast system described below facilitates this through exchange of the Charnock parameter which controls the sea surface roughness. This allows the atmosphere to respond to changes in the surface roughness as the wind sea builds up or decays.

Examples

WAVEWATCH

The operational wave forecasting systems at NOAA are based on the WAVEWATCH III (R) model. This system has a global domain of approximately 50 km resolution, with nested regional domains for the northern hemisphere oceanic basins at approximately 18 km and approximately 7 km resolution.  Physics includes wave field refraction, nonlinear resonant interactions, sub-grid representations of unresolved islands, and dynamically updated ice coverage.  Wind data is provided from the GDAS data assimilation system for the GFS weather model.  Up to 2008, the model was limited to regions outside the surf zone where the waves are not strongly impacted by shallow depths.

The model can incorporate the effects of currents on waves from its early design by Hendrik Tolman in the 1990s, and is now extended for near shore applications.

WAM
The wave model WAM was the first so-called third generation prognostic wave model where the two-dimensional wave spectrum was allowed to evolve freely (up to a cut-off frequency) with no constraints on the spectral shape. The model underwent a series of software updates from its inception in the late 1980s. The last official release is Cycle 4.5, maintained by the German Helmholtz Zentrum, Geesthacht.

ECMWF has incorporated  WAM into its deterministic and ensemble forecasting system., known as the Integrated Forecast System (IFS). The model currently comprises 36 frequency bins and 36 propagation directions at an average spatial resolution of 25 km. The model has been coupled to the atmospheric component of IFS since 1998.

Other models
Wind wave forecasts are issued regionally by Environment Canada.

Regional wave predictions are also produced by universities, such as Texas A&M University’s use of the SWAN model (developed by Delft University of Technology) to forecast waves in the Gulf of Mexico.

Another model, CCHE2D-COAST is a processes-based integrated model which is capable of simulating coastal processes in different coasts with complex shorelines such as irregular wave deformation from offshore to onshore, nearshore currents induced by radiation stresses, wave set-up, wave set-down, sediment transport, and seabed morphological changes.

Other wind wave models include the U.S. Navy Standard Surf Model (NSSM).

Validation

Comparison of the wave model forecasts with observations is essential for characterizing model deficiencies and identifying areas for improvement. In-situ observations are obtained from buoys, ships and oil platforms. Altimetry data from satellites, such as GEOSAT and TOPEX, can also be used to infer the characteristics of wind waves.

Hindcasts of wave models during extreme conditions also serves as a useful test bed for the models.

Reanalyses

A retrospective analysis, or reanalysis, combines all available observations with a physical model to describe the state of a system over a time period of decades.  Wind waves are a part of both the NCEP Reanalysis and the ERA-40 from the ECMWF. Such resources permit the creation of monthly wave climatologies, and can track the variation of wave activity on interannual and multi-decadal time scales.  During the northern hemisphere winter, the most intense wave activity is located in the central North Pacific south of the Aleutians, and in the central North Atlantic south of Iceland. During the southern hemisphere winter, intense wave activity circumscribes the pole at around 50°S, with 5 m significant wave heights typical in the southern Indian Ocean.

References

Physical oceanography
Water waves